Abdellah Baha (‎; 1954 – 7 December 2014) was a Moroccan politician of the Justice and Development Party and member of the Executive Office of the Uniqueness and Reform Movement (MUR). From 3 January 2012 until his death, he served as Minister of State in Abdelilah Benkirane's government.

A native of Souss, Abdellah Baha was an agricultural engineer who graduated from the Hassan II Institute of Agronomy in 1979. He owned the Attajdid newspaper as well as Al Islah and Arraya publications and was MP of Rabat since 2002 (re-elected in 2007, 2011). In 2002–2003, he was the President of the Commission of Justice, Legislation and Human Rights and 2003 to 2006, head of PJD Group. In 2007, he was assigned as vice-speaker of the House of Representatives.

Death
On  7 December 2014, Baha was killed after being struck by a train.

See also
Cabinet of Morocco
Justice and Development Party

References

1954 births
2014 deaths
Moroccan Berber politicians
Government ministers of Morocco
Moroccan engineers
People from Ifrane Atlas-Saghir
Justice and Development Party (Morocco) politicians
Railway accident deaths in the Morocco
Shilha people